Edgerrin Tyree James (born August 1, 1978) is an American former professional football player who was a running back in the National Football League (NFL) for 11 seasons. He played college football at the University of Miami for the Miami Hurricanes. He was drafted by the Indianapolis Colts fourth overall in the 1999 NFL Draft. James also played for the Arizona Cardinals and Seattle Seahawks. 

He was named AP NFL Offensive Rookie of the Year in 1999 and earned four Pro Bowl selections and four All-Pro selections. James is the Colts' all-time leader in career rushing yards, attempts, and touchdowns. James is 13th on the all-time rushing list, and a member of the 10,000 Yards rushing club. He was elected to the Pro Football Hall of Fame as a member of the Class of 2020.

College career

James was recruited out of Florida's Immokalee High School by the University of Miami. He proved to be one of the most successful running backs in the school's history.

James ranks third in all-time University of Miami rushing yards. He was the only running back in school history to post two consecutive seasons with 1,000-plus rushing yards, and he ranks first in school history with the most 100-plus rushing games (14). All single season records held by James have since been broken by former Baltimore Ravens running back Willis McGahee.

James was inducted into the University of Miami Sports Hall of Fame on April 23, 2009 at its 41st Annual Induction Banquet at Jungle Island in Miami.

College statistics

Professional career

Indianapolis Colts

The Indianapolis Colts selected James in the first round of the 1999 NFL Draft as the fourth overall pick. James signed a seven-year, $49 million rookie contract. Some critics believed that the Colts made a mistake by choosing James over the reigning Heisman Trophy winner Ricky Williams.

James quieted the critics and was an immediate success, and was named the 1999 NFL Offensive Rookie of the Year by the Associated Press. James won the NFL rushing title in his first two seasons. He was the last NFL player to win the rushing title in his rookie season before Ezekiel Elliott. Six games into the 2001 season, he tore his ACL.

James had over 1,500 rushing yards in both the 2004 and 2005 seasons.

James left Indianapolis as its all-time leading rusher with 9,226 yards. After James's departure in March 2006, the Colts won Super Bowl XLI the following season. Although he was not on the team at the time, Colts owner Jim Irsay still sent him a Super Bowl ring.

On September 23, 2012, James was inducted into the Indianapolis Colts Ring of Honor during the week 3 game against the Jacksonville Jaguars.

Arizona Cardinals
James signed a four-year, $30 million deal with the Arizona Cardinals on March 23, 2006. With the retirement of Corey Dillon, James became the active leader in career rushing yards at the start of 2007, and remained so through his last game in November 2009 (though he would be passed by LaDainian Tomlinson by the end of the season). James went through a stretch of 10 games out of the 2008 season where he carried the ball only 20 times. Through this time, Ken Whisenhunt brought him in strictly as a pass protector. In Week 17 against the Seattle Seahawks, James carried the ball 14 times for 100 yards. James said he would not come back to Arizona following the 2009 NFL playoffs, despite a year left on his contract. In the Cardinals' first playoff game since 1998, James averaged 4.7 yards per carry and ran for 100 yards. In the Divisional Round of the playoffs, James rushed for 57 yards and a touchdown in the Cardinals' upset victory over the heavily favored Carolina Panthers. James rushed for 73 yards in the Cardinals' 32-25 win over the Philadelphia Eagles in the NFC Championship game. James rushed 9 times for 33 yards in the Cardinals' 27-23 loss to the Pittsburgh Steelers in Super Bowl XLIII.

His long-time girlfriend, the mother of his children, died of cancer in April 2009. After this, he asked for his release from the team, and the Cardinals honored his request on April 28.

Seattle Seahawks
After spending the 2009 offseason grieving with his four children and declining NFL offers, James finally agreed to a one-year, $2 million contract with the Seattle Seahawks on August 24, 2009, missing the team's training camp. The team released running back T. J. Duckett to make room for James on the roster. However, James rushed for only 125 yards on a career-low 46 carries. He played in only seven games, and on November 3, 2009, Seattle cut him from the team.

On July 26, 2011, James announced his retirement from professional football. He had amassed 12,246 rushing yards (11th all-time at the time of his last game in 2009) and 80 rushing touchdowns (15th).

Colts franchise records
 Most career rushing yards (9,226)
 Most career rushing touchdowns (64)
 Best career rushing yards per game average: 96.1
 Most seasons with 1,000 rushing yards (5)

NFL career statistics

Regular season

Personal life
James currently resides in Miami, Florida. He has six children, including Eden, a running back committed to Howard, and Edgerrin Jr., who is a four-star basketball recruit in the class of 2023, committed to the University of Cincinnati. On April 14, 2009, Andia Wilson, James' long-time girlfriend and the mother of four of his children, died from leukemia at the age of 30. He is the second cousin of current LA Chargers safety Derwin James.

References

External links

Seattle Seahawks bio

1978 births
Living people
African-American players of American football
American Conference Pro Bowl players
American football running backs
Arizona Cardinals players
Indianapolis Colts players
Miami Hurricanes football players
National Football League Offensive Rookie of the Year Award winners
People from Immokalee, Florida
Players of American football from Arizona
Players of American football from Indianapolis
Players of American football from Miami
Players of American football from Seattle
Pro Football Hall of Fame inductees
Seattle Seahawks players